Špirić is a surname found in Croatia, Bosnia and Serbia, a patronymic derived from Špiro. Notable people with the surname include:

Nikola Špirić (born 1956), Bosnian politician
Jelena Špirić (born 1983), Serbian women's basketball player

Serbian surnames
Patronymic surnames
Croatian surnames